Osama Al-Bawardi (born 25 December 1999) is a Saudi Arabian professional footballer who plays as a right back for Ohod.

Career
Al-Bawardi began his career at the youth team of Al-Nassr on 25 July 2013 . On 25 August 2019, Al-Bawardi signed for Al-Jabalain on loan from Al-Nassr . On 4 September 2019, Al-Bowardi was subjected to a blow from one of the Al-Khaleej players in the match between the two teams in MS League . On 12 October, Al-Bawardi signed for Al-Diriyah on loan from Al-Nassr . On 13 August 2021, Al-Bawardi joined Al-Sahel on loan. On 16 July 2022, Al-Bawardi joined Ohod following the expiration of his contract with Al-Nassr.

References

1999 births
Living people
Saudi Arabian footballers
Al Nassr FC players
Al-Jabalain FC players
Al-Diriyah Club players
Al-Sahel SC (Saudi Arabia) players
Ohod Club players
Saudi First Division League players
Association football fullbacks